Talladega City Schools is the school district of Talladega, Alabama. The district includes four elementary schools, one middle school, one high school, and one technical school.

Schools 
 Young Elementary
 Graham Elementary
 Houston Elementary
 Salter Elementary
 Zora Ellis Junior High School
 Talladega High School
 Talladega Career/Technical Center

References

External links 
 

School districts in Alabama
Schools in Talladega County, Alabama